Juan Rodríguez Martínez (born 8 May 1995) is a Spanish footballer who plays for San Fernando CD. Mainly a central defender, he can also play as a defensive midfielder.

Club career
Born in Cedeira, A Coruña, Galicia, Rodríguez joined Racing de Ferrol's youth setup in 2010, from hometown club Cedeira SD. He made his senior debut on 1 December 2012, coming on as a late substitute for Manu Barreiro in a 4–1 away routing of Narón BP in the Tercera División.

Rodríguez appeared only rarely for Racing in the following years, spending a full season with the reserves in the regional leagues. He left the club in 2014, and joined fourth tier side Arosa SC on 17 July of that year.

After being an undisputed starter during the campaign, Rodríguez joined UD Somozas of the Segunda División B on 7 July 2015. The following 24 June, he signed a two-year deal with another reserve team, Sporting de Gijón B in the fourth division.

Rodríguez made his first-team – and La Liga – debut on 22 October 2016, starting in a 0–0 away draw against Granada CF. Ahead of the 2018–19 season, he was definitely promoted to the main squad after agreeing to a new two-year contract.

On 29 July 2019, Rodríguez agreed to a two-year deal with Gimnàstic de Tarragona in the third division, after terminating his link with Sporting. He left the club by mutual agreement on 24 August of the following year, and agreed to a three-year deal with fellow league team San Fernando CD just hours later.

References

External links

1995 births
Living people
People from Ferrol (comarca)
Sportspeople from the Province of A Coruña
Spanish footballers
Footballers from Galicia (Spain)
Association football defenders
La Liga players
Segunda División players
Segunda División B players
Tercera División players
Racing de Ferrol footballers
Sporting de Gijón B players
Sporting de Gijón players
Gimnàstic de Tarragona footballers
San Fernando CD players